Euridice is an opera in a prologue and one act by the Italian composer Giulio Caccini. The libretto, by Ottavio Rinuccini, had already been set by Caccini's rival Jacopo Peri in 1600. Caccini's version of Euridice was first performed at the Pitti Palace, Florence, on 5 December 1602. Caccini hurriedly prepared the score for the press and published it six weeks before Peri's version appeared.

Roles

Synopsis
The opera follows the myth of Orpheus and Eurydice quite closely, except that it has a happy ending since Orpheus succeeds in rescuing Eurydice from the underworld through the power of his music.

Recordings
Euridice Soloists, Rennes Chorus and Orchestra, conducted by Rodrigo de Zayas (Arion, 1980)
L'Euridice Scherzi Musicali, Nicolas Achten (Ricercar, 2008)

References

Further reading
The Viking Opera Guide, ed. Amanda Holden (Viking, 1993)
Del Teatro (in Italian)
The Oxford Illustrated History of Opera ed. Parker (Oxford University Press, 1994)

External links

Italian-language operas
Pastoral operas
1602 operas
Operas by Giulio Caccini
Operas
Operas about Orpheus
Operas based on Metamorphoses